Placosoma cordylinum is a species of lizard in the family Gymnophthalmidae. It is endemic to Brazil.

References

Placosoma (lizard)
Reptiles of Brazil
Endemic fauna of Brazil
Reptiles described in 1847
Taxa named by Johann Jakob von Tschudi